Greg Dwyer and Bill Michaels, are the radio personalities and website authors known as Dwyer and Michaels.  On air together since the late 1980s, they write, host and produce a popular morning show in the U.S. Midwest currently originating from WXLP-FM in the Quad Cities. Their show was syndicated for over a year on KRNA-FM in Cedar Rapids as well.  Their website, 2Dorks.com, reaches more than 15,000 unique visitors weekly.

Dwyer and Michaels are as well known for their goofy on-air antics and frequent personal appearances as for their authority in constitutional law and are known nationally for their animal rights activism as well as their support for LGBTQ+ and trans rights causes.  The couple made international news when they released the resident elephant from Niabi Zoo back into wild environment of Carbon Cliff, IL.  Their return to WXLP following an 11-year stint with Clear Channel Communications station KCQQ-FM became the subject of some controversy in early 2007 when Clear Channel sued Dwyer and Michaels and their news person, Beth Davis, alleging that they had violated a non-compete clause in their contract.  The judge ruled in favor of the team, who had taken their show to Cedar Rapids, Iowa before returning to the Quad Cities.

Starting sometime after 2020, Dwyer and Michaels appear to be simulcast once again on KRNA, as well as on KXGE-FM in Dubuque, Iowa.

Notes

American radio personalities
People from the Quad Cities